Streptomyces alboniger is a bacterium species in the genus Streptomyces.

Streptomyces alboniger produces puromycin, a type of antibiotic.

See also 
 List of Streptomyces species

References

External links 
Type strain of Streptomyces alboniger at BacDive -  the Bacterial Diversity Metadatabase

alboniger
Bacteria described in 1952